Seniors is a 2011 Indian Malayalam-language comedy thriller film directed by Vysakh and written by Sachi-Sethu. The plot follows four friends who return to their alma mater as students. It stars Jayaram, Kunchacko Boban, Biju Menon, and Manoj K. Jayan. The film features a score by Gopi Sundar and songs by Alphons Joseph, Jassie Gift, and Alex Paul. The film was released in India and the United Kingdom on 7 May 2011. The film was a blockbuster at the box office.

Plot
The film starts with two flashback scenes. In 1981, a husband is waiting for his flirtatious wife to come home and take care of their son and baby daughter . The wife comes with her boyfriend and after a fight decides to leave the husband and child. In another flashback, it's a college day festival in 1996. After a dance performance, Indu comes to enquire about her sister Lakshmi who is with her four friends and one of them says he would drop her home. The friends are having a good time enjoying the college day festival. In sudden turn of events, there is a loud scream and all the students rush out to see what happened, only to find Lakshmi dead. In Present Day, out of the four friends Rex Immanuel, Philip Idikkula, and Rashid Munna, 3 of them are excited to know about the return of Pappu alias Padmanabhan who was accused and spent time in jail for the murder of Lakshmi. Due to Pappu's stubbornness, the friends decide to get back to their studies, after a gap of 12 years. Now back from jail, Pappu wants to start everything from where they have missed it and the other three support him, taking a break from their jobs and joining the college for an M.A in Philosophy. Following certain hilarious sequences of the foursome in college, there are some interesting twists and turns to the plot, but the main aim of Pappu is to find the deep mystery behind the tragedy that happened 12 years ago and to find the killer which is among his friends. At the end of the college festival programme he identifies the killer of Lakshmi is none other than his friend Rex. Rex reveals that he was in love with Lakshmi and on her birthday when he came to visit her, he saw Lakshmi in bed with another person which made him angry to know that two women in his life—his mother and Lakshmi—are cheaters which made him kill Lakshmi. After saying this, he targets Jenny but Pappu stops him. He becomes the convict to save Rex. The film ends with Pappu is back to college and everything is back to normal.

Cast

Box office
The film was commercial success. This movie was a blockbuster and ran over 125 days and grossed a total of ₹16 crore.

Soundtrack

References

External links 
 Indiaglitz article

2010s Malayalam-language films
2010s comedy mystery films
Indian comedy mystery films
Films shot in Kochi
Films shot in Thrissur
Films directed by Vysakh
2011 comedy films
2011 films
Films scored by Alphons Joseph
Films scored by Alex Paul
Films scored by Jassie Gift